Masei, Mas'ei, or Masse ( — Hebrew for "journeys," the second word, and the first distinctive word, in the parashah) is the 43rd weekly Torah portion (parashah) in the annual Jewish cycle of Torah reading and the 10th and last in the Book of Numbers. The parashah comprises . The parashah discusses the stations of the Israelites' journeys, instructions for taking the land of Israel, cities for the Levites and refuge, and the daughters of Zelophehad.

It is made up of 5,773 Hebrew letters, 1,461 Hebrew words, 132 verses, and 189 lines in a Torah Scroll (Sefer Torah). Jews generally read it in July or August. The lunisolar Hebrew calendar contains up to 55 Saturdays, the exact number varying between 50 in common years and 54 or 55 in leap years. In some leap years (for example, 2014), parashat Masei is read separately. In most years (all coming years until 2035 in the Diaspora, until 2022 in Israel), parashat Masei is combined with the previous parashah, Matot, to help achieve the number of weekly readings needed.

Readings

First reading — Numbers 33:1–10
In the first reading (aliyah), Moses recorded the various journeys of the Israelites from the land of Egypt as directed by God as follows: They journeyed from Rameses to Sukkoth to Etham to Pi-hahiroth to Marah to Elim to the Sea of Reeds.

Second reading — Numbers 33:11–49
In the second reading (aliyah), the Israelites journeyed from the Sea of Reeds to the wilderness of Sin to Dophkah to Alush to Rephidim to the wilderness of Sinai to Kibroth-hattaavah to Hazeroth to Rithmah to Rimmon-perez to Libnah to Rissah to Kehelath to Mount Shepher Haradah to Makheloth to Tahath to Terah to Mithkah to Hashmonah to Moseroth to Bene-jaakan to Hor-haggidgad to Jotbath to Abronah to Ezion-geber to Kadesh to Mount Hor. At God's command, Aaron ascended Mount Hor and died there, at the age of 123 years. They journeyed from Mount Hor to Zalmonah to Punon to Oboth to Iye-abarim to Dibon-gad to Almon-diblathaim to the hills of Abarim to the steppes of Moab.

Third reading — Numbers 33:50–34:15
In the third reading (aliyah), in the steppes of Moab, God told Moses to direct the Israelites that when they crossed the Jordan into Canaan, they were to dispossess all the inhabitants of the land, destroy all their figured objects, molten images, and cult places, and take possession of and settle in the land. They were to apportion the land among themselves by lot, clan by clan, with the share varying with the size of the group. But God warned that if the Israelites did not dispossess the inhabitants of the land, those whom they allowed to remain would become stings in their eyes and thorns in their sides, and would harass the Israelites in the land, so that God would do to the Israelites what God had planned to do to the inhabitants of the land. God then told Moses to instruct the Israelites in the boundaries of the land, which included the Dead Sea, the wilderness of Zin, the Wadi of Egypt, the Mediterranean Sea, Mount Hor, the eastern slopes of the Sea of Galilee, and the River Jordan. Moses informed the Israelites that the tribe of Reuben, the tribe of Gad, and the half-tribe of Manasseh had received their portions across the Jordan.

Fourth reading — Numbers 34:16–29
In the fourth reading (aliyah), God told Moses the names of the men through whom the Israelites were to apportioned the land: Eleazar, Joshua, and a chieftain named from each tribe.

Fifth reading — Numbers 35:1–8
In the fifth reading (aliyah), God told Moses to instruct the Israelites to assign the Levites out of the other tribes' holdings towns and pasture land for 2,000 cubits outside the town wall in each direction. The Israelites were to assign the Levites 48 towns in all, of which 6 were to be Cities of Refuge to which a manslayer could flee. The Israelites were to take more towns from the larger tribes and fewer from the smaller.

Sixth reading — Numbers 35:9–34
In the sixth reading (aliyah), three of the six Cities of Refuge were to be designated east of the Jordan, and the other three were to be designated in the land of Canaan. The Cities of Refuge were to serve as places to which a slayer who had killed a person unintentionally could flee from the avenger, so that the slayer might not die without a trial before the assembly. Anyone, however, who struck and killed another with an iron object, stone tool, or wood tool was to be considered a murderer, and was to be put to death. The blood-avenger was to put the murderer to death upon encounter. Similarly, if the killer pushed or struck the victim by hand in hate or hurled something at the victim on purpose and death resulted, the assailant was to be put to death as a murderer. But if the slayer pushed the victim without malice aforethought, hurled an object at the victim unintentionally, or inadvertently dropped on the victim any deadly object of stone, and death resulted — without the victim being an enemy of the slayer and without the slayer seeking the victim harm — then the assembly was to decide between the slayer and the blood-avenger. The assembly was to protect the slayer from the blood-avenger, and the assembly was to restore the slayer to the city of refuge to which the slayer fled, and there the slayer was to remain until the death of the high priest. But if the slayer ever left the city of refuge, and the blood-avenger came upon the slayer outside the city limits, then there would be no bloodguilt if the blood-avenger killed the slayer. The slayer was to remain inside the city of refuge until the death of the high priest, after which the slayer could return to his land. A slayer could be executed only on the evidence of more than one witness. The Israelites were not to accept a ransom for the life of a murderer guilty of a capital crime; the murderer was to be put to death. Similarly, the Israelites were not to accept ransom in lieu of flight to a city of refuge, enabling a slayer to return to live on the slayer's land before the death of the high priest. Bloodshed polluted the land, and only the blood of the one who shed it could make expiation for the bloodshed.

Seventh reading — Numbers 36:1–13
In the seventh reading (aliyah), kinsmen of Zelophehad, a man of the tribe of Manasseh who had died without a son, appealed to Moses and the chieftains regarding Zelophehad's daughters, to whom God had commanded Moses to assign land. Zelophehad's kinsmen expressed the concern that if Zelophehad's daughters married men from another Israelite tribe, their land would be cut off from Manasseh's ancestral portion and be added to the portion of the husbands' tribe. At God's bidding, Moses instructed the Israelites that the daughters of Zelophehad could marry only men from their father's tribe, so that no inheritance would pass from one tribe to another. And Moses announced the general rule that every daughter who inherited a share was required to marry someone from her father's tribe, in order to preserve each tribe's ancestral share. The daughters of Zelophehad did as God had commanded Moses, and they married cousins, men of the tribe of Manasseh.

Readings according to the triennial cycle
Jews who read the Torah according to the triennial cycle of Torah reading read the parashah according to a different schedule.

In inner-biblical interpretation
The parashah has parallels or is discussed in these Biblical sources:

Numbers chapter 35
The Torah addresses the need for corroborating witnesses three times.  instructs that a manslayer may be executed only on the evidence of two or more witnesses.  states the same multiple witness requirement for all capital cases. And  applies the rule to all criminal offenses.

Numbers chapter 36
And then  reports the awarding of lands to the daughters of Zelophehad.

In early nonrabbinic interpretation
The parashah has parallels or is discussed in these early nonrabbinic sources:

Numbers chapter 35

Philo called the rule of  that a judge should not receive the testimony of a single witness "an excellent commandment." Philo argued first that a person might inadvertently gain a false impression of a thing or be careless about observing and therefore be deceived. Secondly, Philo argued it unjust to trust to one witness against many persons, or indeed against only one individual, for why should the judge trust a single witness testifying against another, rather than the defendant pleading on the defendant's own behalf? Where there is no preponderance of opinion for guilt, Philo argued, it is best to suspend judgment.

In classical rabbinic interpretation
The parashah is discussed in these rabbinic sources from the era of the Mishnah and the Talmud:

Numbers chapter 33
A Midrash taught that God told the Israelites that during all the 40 years that they spent in the wilderness, God did not make it necessary for them to flee. Rather, God cast their enemies down before them. As  reports, there were numerous snakes, fiery serpents, and scorpions in the wilderness, but God did not allow them to harm the Israelites. Thus, God told Moses to write down in  the stages by which Israel journeyed in the wilderness, so that they would know the miracles that God had performed for them.

Noting that both  and Psalm  report that the Israelites travelled "under the hand of Moses and Aaron," a Midrash taught that the similarity served to confirm that God led the Israelites in the wilderness (in the words of ) "like a flock."

On the way back, the king retraced all their previous journeys, noted where his son caught cold and where his son's head ached.

Thus, when God told Moses to slay the paschal lamb (as reflected in ), Moses asked God how he could possibly do so, when the lamb was as Egyptian god. God replied that the Israelites would not depart from Egypt until they slaughtered the Egyptian gods before the Egyptians' eyes, so that God might teach them that their gods were really nothing at all. And thus God did so, for on the same night that God slew the Egyptian firstborn, the Israelites slaughtered their paschal lambs and ate them. When the Egyptians saw their firstborn slain and their gods slaughtered, they could do nothing, as  reports, "While the Egyptians were burying them whom the Lord had smitten among them, even all their firstborn; upon their gods also the Lord executed judgment."

Reading , "Upon their gods also the Lord executed judgments," the Pirke De-Rabbi Eliezer taught that when the Israelites left Egypt, God cast down and broke all the Egyptians' idols.

The Gemara taught that while the Israelites were in the Jordan River with the water standing up in a heap (as reported in ), Joshua told them that they were crossing the Jordan on condition that they would disinherit the inhabitants of the land, as  says: "Then you shall drive out all the inhabitants of the land from before you." Joshua told them that if they did this, it would be well and good; otherwise, the water would return and drown them.

It was taught in a Baraita that Rabbi Josiah said that the land of Israel was apportioned according to those who came out of Egypt, as  says, "according to the names of the tribes of their fathers they shall inherit." The Gemara proposed that "unto these" meant adults, to the exclusion of minors. But Rabbi Jonathan taught that the land was apportioned according to those who entered the land, for  says, "Unto these the land shall be divided for an inheritance." The Gemara posited that according to this view,  taught that the manner of inheritance of the land of Israel differed from all other modes of inheritance in the world. For in all other modes of inheritance in the world, the living inherit from the dead, but in this case, the dead inherited from the living. Rabbi Simeon ben Eleazar taught a third view — that the land was divided both according to those who left Egypt and also according to those who entered the land of Israel, so as to carry out both verses. The Gemara explained that according to this view, one among those who came out of Egypt received a share among those who came out of Egypt, and one who entered the land of Israel received a share among those who entered the land. And one who belonged to both categories received a share among both categories.

Numbers chapter 35

The Mishnah taught that those who killed in error went into banishment. One would go into banishment if, for example, while one was pushing a roller on a roof, the roller slipped over, fell, and killed someone. One would go into banishment if while one was lowering a cask, it fell down and killed someone. One would go into banishment if while coming down a ladder, one fell and killed someone. But one would not go into banishment if while pulling up the roller it fell back and killed someone, or while raising a bucket the rope snapped and the falling bucket killed someone, or while going up a ladder one fell down and killed someone. The Mishnah's general principle was that whenever the death occurred in the course of a downward movement, the culpable person went into banishment, but if the death did not occur in the course of a downward movement, the person did not go into banishment. If while chopping wood, the iron slipped from the ax handle and killed someone, Rabbi taught that the person did not go into banishment, but the sages said that the person did go into banishment. If from the split log rebounding killed someone, Rabbi said that the person went into banishment, but the sages said that the person did not go into banishment.

Rabbi Jose bar Judah taught that to begin with, they sent a slayer to a city of refuge, whether the slayer killed intentionally or not. Then the court sent and brought the slayer back from the city of refuge. The Court executed whomever the court found guilty of a capital crime, and the court acquitted whomever the court found not guilty of a capital crime. The court restored to the city of refuge whomever the court found liable to banishment, as  ordained, "And the congregation shall restore him to the city of refuge from where he had fled."  also says, "The manslayer ... shall dwell therein until the death of the high priest, who was anointed with the holy oil," but the Mishnah taught that the death of a high priest who had been anointed with the holy anointing oil, the death of a high priest who had been consecrated by the many vestments, or the death of a high priest who had retired from his office each equally made possible the return of the slayer. Rabbi Judah said that the death of a priest who had been anointed for war also permitted the return of the slayer. Because of these laws, mothers of high priests would provide food and clothing for the slayers in Cities of Refuge so that the slayers might not pray for the high priest's death. If the high priest died at the conclusion of the slayer's trial, the slayer did not go into banishment. If, however, the high priests died before the trial was concluded and another high priest was appointed in his stead and then the trial concluded, the slayer returned home after the new high priest's death.

The Baraita reasoned from this similar usage that just as the law prohibits kindling fire at home, so the law also prohibits kindling fire in the furtherance of criminal justice. And thus, since some executions require kindling a fire, the Baraita taught that the law prohibits executions on the Sabbath.

The Gemara read , “And the congregation shall judge . . . and the congregation shall save,” to requires a court to search for grounds to exonerate the defendant.

The Gemara read  to limit the participation of witnesses and Rabbinical students in trials. The Mishnah taught that in monetary cases, all may argue for or against the defendant, but in capital cases, all may argue in favor of the defendant, but not against the defendant. The Gemara asked whether the reference to "all" in this Mishnah included even the witnesses. Rabbi Jose son of Rabbi Judah and the Rabbis disagreed to some degree. Rabbi Jose son of Rabbi Judah taught that a witness could argue for acquittal, but not for condemnation. Rav Papa taught that the word "all" means to include not the witnesses, but the Rabbinical students who attended trials, and thus was not inconsistent with the views of Rabbi Jose son of Rabbi Judah or of the Rabbis. The Gemara explained the reasoning of Rabbi Jose son of Rabbi Judah for his view that witnesses may argue in favor of the accused as follows:  says, "But one witness shall not testify against any person that he die." Hence, according to the reasoning of Rabbi Jose son of Rabbi Judah, only "so that he die" could the witness not argue, but the witness could argue for acquittal. And Resh Lakish explained the reasoning of the Rabbis forbidding a witness to argue in favor of the accused as follows: The Rabbis reasoned that if a witness could argue the case, then the witness might seem personally concerned in his testimony (for a witness contradicted by subsequent witnesses could be subject to execution for testifying falsely). The Gemara then asked how the Rabbis interpreted the words, "so that he die" (which seems to indicate that the witness may not argue only when it leads to death). The Gemara explained that the Rabbis read those words to apply to the Rabbinical students (constraining the students not to argue for condemnation). A Baraita taught that they did not listen to a witnesses who asked to make a statement in the defendant's favor, because  says, "But one witness shall not testify." And they did not listen to a Rabbinical student who asked to argue a point to the defendant's disadvantage, because  says, "One shall not testify against any person that he die" (but a student could do so for acquittal).

The Gemara cited the Torah's requirement for corroborating witnesses to support the Mishnah's prohibition of circumstantial evidence in capital cases. The Mishnah reported that they admonished witnesses in capital cases not to testify based on conjecture (that is, circumstantial evidence) or hearsay, for the court would scrutinize the witnesses' evidence by cross-examination and inquiry. The Gemara reported that the Rabbis taught that the words "based on conjecture" in the Mishnah meant that the judge told the witness that if the witness saw the defendant running after the victim into a ruin, and the witness pursued the defendant and found the defendant with bloody sword in hand and the victim writhing in agony, then the judge would tell the witness that the witness saw nothing (and did not actually witness a murder). It was taught in a Baraita that Rabbi Simeon ben Shetach said that he once did see a man pursuing his fellow into a ruin, and when Rabbi Simeon ben Shetach ran after the man and saw him, bloody sword in hand and the murdered man writhing, Rabbi Simeon ben Shetach exclaimed to the man, "Wicked man, who slew this man? It is either you or I! But what can I do, since your blood (that is, life) does not rest in my hands, for it is written in the Torah (in ) 'At the mouth of two witnesses ... shall he who is to die be put to death'? May He who knows one's thoughts (that is, God) exact vengeance from him who slew his fellow!" The Gemara reported that before they moved from the place, a serpent bit the murderer and he died.

In the Mishnah, Rabbi Jose said that a malefactor was never put to death unless two witnesses had duly pre-admonished the malefactor, as  prescribes, "At the mouth of two witnesses or three witnesses shall he that is worthy of death be put to death." And the Mishnah reported another interpretation of the words, "At the mouth of two witnesses," was that the Sanhedrin would not hear evidence from the mouth of an interpreter.

Rav Zutra bar Tobiah reported that Rav reasoned that  disqualified isolated testimony when it prescribes that "at the mouth of one witness he shall not be put to death." This special admonition against one witness would seem redundant to the earlier context, "At the mouth of two witnesses or three witnesses shall he that is worthy of death be put to death," so it was taken to mean that individual witnesses who witnesses the crime, one by one, in isolation from each other, were insufficient to convict. Similarly, a Baraita taught that  prescribes, "At the mouth of one witness he shall not be put to death," to cover instances where two persons see the wrongdoer, one from one window and the other from another window, without seeing each other, in which case the evidence could not be joined to form a set of witnesses sufficient to convict. Even if they both witnessed the offence from the same window, one after the other, their testimony could not be joined to form a set of witnesses sufficient to convict.

Rabbi Ishmael the son of Rabbi Jose commanded Rabbi Judah the Prince not to engage in a lawsuit against three parties, for one would be an opponent and the other two would be witnesses for the other side.

Rabbi Ishmael cited , in which the right to defend one’s home at night takes precedence over the prohibition of killing, to support the proposition that the avoidance of danger to human life takes precedence over the laws of the Sabbath. So even if in the case of the thief — where doubt exists whether the thief came to take money or life, and even though  teaches that the shedding of blood pollutes the land, so that the Divine Presence departs from Israel — yet it was lawful to save oneself at the cost of the thief’s life, how much more may one suspend the laws of the Sabbath to save human life.

Numbers chapter 36

A Baraita taught that Zelophehad's daughters were wise, Torah students, and righteous.

In medieval Jewish interpretation
The parashah is discussed in these medieval Jewish sources:

Numbers chapter 35

In modern interpretation
The parashah is discussed in these modern sources:

Numbers chapter 33

Finkelstein and Silberman reported that a late thirteenth century BCE Egyptian papyrus recorded that the commanders of the forts along the delta's eastern border closely monitored the movements of foreigners there, saying: "We have completed the entry of the tribes of the Edomite Shasu (that is, Bedouin) through the fortress of Merneptah-Content-with-Truth, which is in Tjkw, to the pools of Pr-Itm which (are) in Tjkw for the sustenance of their flocks." And Finkelstein and Silberman reported that the abundant Egyptian sources describing the time of the New Kingdom of Egypt in general and the thirteenth century in particular make no reference to the Israelites. Finkelstein and Silberman also noted that according to the Biblical narrative, the Israelites camped at Kadesh-barnea for 38 of the 40 years of their wanderings.  makes clear Kadesh's general location from its description of the southern border of the land of Israel, and archaeologists have identified it with the large and well-watered oasis of Ein el-Qudeirat in eastern Sinai, on the border between modern Israel and Egypt. The name Kadesh was probably preserved over the centuries in the name of a nearby smaller spring called Ein Qadis. A small mound with the remains of a Late Iron Age fort stands at the center of this oasis. Yet repeated excavations and surveys throughout the area have not provided even the slightest evidence for activity in the Late Bronze Age, not even a single sherd left by a tiny fleeing band of frightened refugees. Finkelstein and Silberman concluded that based on the evidence at the specific sites where  says that the Israelites camped for extended periods during their wandering in the desert (and where some archaeological indication — if present — would almost certainly be found), a mass Exodus did not happen at the time and in the manner described in the Bible.

Numbers chapter 35

Noting that  provided that the person who had committed manslaughter would remain in the city of refuge until the death of the high priest, Plaut argued that only death could compensate for the loss of the victim's life, and thus the death of the High Priest became the symbol of communal expiation.

Explaining the origins of the law that one can see in the Cities of Refuge, Justice Oliver Wendell Holmes Jr. wrote that early forms of legal procedure were grounded in vengeance. Roman law and German law started from the blood feud, which led to the composition, at first optional, then compulsory, by which the feud was bought off. Holmes reported that in Anglo-Saxon practice, the feud was pretty well broken up by the time of William the Conqueror. The killings and house-burnings of an earlier day became the appeals of mayhem and arson, and then the legal actions now familiar to lawyers.

Trumbull taught that the redeemer's mission was "not vengeance, but equity. He was not an avenger, but a redeemer, a restorer, a balancer."

In an echo of the requirement in  that the Israelites could execute a manslayer only with the evidence of two or more witnesses, Article III, Section 3 of the United States Constitution provides that the government may convict a person of treason only with the testimony of two witnesses to the same overt act or a confession in open court. A then-recent precursor of the Constitution's provision appeared in 1776 in the Laws of Virginia, which provided that defendants be "convicted of open deed by the evidence of two sufficient and lawful witnesses, or their own voluntary confession." At the Constitutional Convention, the requirement for two witnesses first appeared in the first draft of the Constitution presented on August 6, 1787. During debate on August 20, 1787, John Dickinson of Delaware questioned what was meant by the "testimony of two witnesses" and whether they were to be witnesses to the same overt act or to different overt acts. The Convention consequently voted to insert the words "to the same overt act" after "two witnesses." Benjamin Franklin supported the amendment, arguing that prosecutions for treason were virulent and perjury too easily made use of against innocent defendants. In The Federalist Papers, Alexander Hamilton cited the requirement for two witnesses to establish treason as one of several provisions in the Constitution that enumerate rights that, taken together, amounted to a bill of rights.

Commandments

According to Maimonides and Sefer ha-Chinuch, there are 2 positive and 4 negative commandments in the parashah:
To give the Levites cities to inhabit and their surrounding fields
Not to kill the murderer before he stands trial
The court must send the accidental murderer to a city of refuge
That a witness in a trial for a capital crime should not speak in judgment
Not to accept monetary restitution to atone for the murderer
Not to accept monetary restitution instead of being sent to a city of refuge

Haftarah
The haftarah for the parashah is:
for Ashkenazi Jews:  and 3:4.
for Sephardi Jews:  and 4:1–2.

When parashah Masei is combined with parashah Matot (as it will be until 2035), the haftarah is the haftarah for parashah Masei.

Notes

Further reading
The parashah has parallels or is discussed in these sources:

Biblical
 (place of refuge).
 (Zelophehad's daughters).
 (Cities of Refuge);  (two witnesses);  (Cities of Refuge).
 (Zelophehad's daughters);  (Cities of Refuge).

Early nonrabbinic
Philo, Allegorical Interpretation 2:10:35; That the Worse Is Wont To Attack the Better 40:147; On the Unchangeableness of God 37:183; On Drunkenness 30:114; On the Confusion of Tongues 13:55; On the Migration of Abraham 25:139; On the Change of Names 37:203; On Dreams, That They Are God-Sent 2:4:30; The Special Laws 1:32:158–61; 4:8:53. Alexandria, Egypt, early 1st Century C.E. In, e.g., The Works of Philo: Complete and Unabridged, New Updated Edition. Translated by Charles Duke Yonge, pages 41, 128, 173, 217, 239, 266, 358, 390, 548–49, 621. Peabody, Massachusetts: Hendrickson Publishers, 1993. .

Matthew  Antioch, circa 80–90 CE. (evidence of two or three witnesses).
Josephus, Antiquities of the Jews 4:4:3, 7; 4:7:4–5 ; 4:8:15 . Circa 93–94. In, e.g., The Works of Josephus: Complete and Unabridged, New Updated Edition. Translated by William Whiston, pages 106–07, 114, 117. Peabody, Massachusetts: Hendrickson Publishers, 1987. .

Classical rabbinic
Mishnah: Shekalim 3:2; Sotah 5:3; Kiddushin 3:4; Bava Batra 8:1–8; Sanhedrin 1:6; 4:1, 5; Makkot 2:1–3:10. Land of Israel, circa 200 C.E. In, e.g., The Mishnah: A New Translation. Translated by Jacob Neusner, pages 255, 455, 574–76, 585, 589–91, 612–16. New Haven: Yale University Press, 1988. .
Tosefta: Terumot 2:12; Challah 2:11; Bikkurim 1:2; Sotah 4:8, 5:13, 8:5; Bava Kamma 8:19; Bava Batra 7:1–18; Sanhedrin 3:7, 4:1; Makkot 2:1–3:10; Bekhorot 6:19; Keritot 4:3. Land of Israel, circa 250 C.E. In, e.g., The Tosefta: Translated from the Hebrew, with a New Introduction. Translated by Jacob Neusner, volume 1, pages 141, 340, 345, 854, 869, 848; volume 2, pages 999, 1122–26, 1153, 1155, 1202–08, 1490, 1568. Peabody, Massachusetts: Hendrickson Publishers, 2002. .
Sifre to Numbers, paragraph 159. Land of Israel, circa 250–350 C.E. 

Jerusalem Talmud: Sheviit 44a, 47b; Terumot 63a, 72a; Challah 15b, 18a, 44b–45a; Shabbat 55a, 88b; Eruvin 37b; Yoma 2b, 50a; Rosh Hashanah 1b, 17b; Taanit 16b, 30b; Megillah 15b; Ketubot 18a, 55a; Nedarim 9b; Nazir 26a; Sotah 8b, 27a; Gittin 4b; Bava Batra 24b; Sanhedrin 1a, 10b, 23a, 27a–b, 36a, 39a, 57b; Makkot 1a–11a; Shevuot 5a, 21b, 24a; Horayot 15a. Tiberias]], Land of Israel, circa 400 CE. In, e.g., Talmud Yerushalmi. Edited by Chaim Malinowitz, Yisroel Simcha Schorr, and Mordechai Marcus, volumes 6b, 8, 11, 14–15, 17, 21, 24–26, 31–33, 35–36, 38, 43–46, 49. Brooklyn: Mesorah Publications, 2006–2019. And in, e.g., The Jerusalem Talmud: A Translation and Commentary. Edited by Jacob Neusner and translated by Jacob Neusner, Tzvee Zahavy, B. Barry Levy, and Edward Goldman. Peabody, Massachusetts: Hendrickson Publishers, 2009. .
Genesis Rabbah 6:1; 40:6; 48:12; 96 (MSV); 98:5. Land of Israel, 5th century. In, e.g., Midrash Rabbah: Genesis. Translated by Harry Freedman and Maurice Simon, volume 1, pages 41, 330–31, 414; volume 2, pages 930, 954. London: Soncino Press, 1939. .
Leviticus Rabbah 3:1; 9:9; 10:6; 13:1; 20:7; 36:1. Land of Israel, 5th century. In, e.g., Midrash Rabbah: Leviticus. Translated by Harry Freedman and Maurice Simon, volume 4, pages 36, 115, 130, 163–64, 258, 456. London: Soncino Press, 1939. .
Babylonian Talmud: Berakhot 4b, 9a; Shabbat 33a; Eruvin 35b, 51a, 55b, 56b–57a; Pesachim 8b, 12a; Yoma 73a, 75b; Rosh Hashanah 2b–3a, 26a; Taanit 30b; Megillah 11a; Moed Katan 5a; Yevamot 6b, 13b; Ketubot 33b, 35a, 37b; Nedarim 81a, 87b; Sotah 27b, 34a, 47b, 48b; Gittin 8a; Kiddushin 42a; Bava Kamma 4a, 26a–b, 28a, 32b, 45a, 83b, 86b–87a, 91a; Bava Metzia 31b; Bava Batra 17a, 24b, 100b, 108a–39b, 159b; Sanhedrin 3b, 10a, 13b, 15b, 18a, 29a, 32a, 33b–34a, 35b, 45b, 49a, 53a, 69a, 72b, 76b, 77b, 84b, 91a; Makkot 2a, 5a–6a, 7a–13a; Shevuot 7b–8a, 33b; Avodah Zarah 9b; Horayot 11b; Zevachim 117a; Bekhorot 55a; Arakhin 33b; Temurah 16a; Keritot 26a. Sasanian Empire, 6th Century. In, e.g., Talmud Bavli. Edited by Yisroel Simcha Schorr, Chaim Malinowitz, and Mordechai Marcus, 72 volumes. Brooklyn: Mesorah Pubs., 2006.

Medieval
Rashi. Commentary. Numbers 33–36. Troyes, France, late 11th Century. In, e.g., Rashi. The Torah: With Rashi's Commentary Translated, Annotated, and Elucidated. Translated and annotated by Yisrael Isser Zvi Herczeg, volume 4, pages 403–34. Brooklyn: Mesorah Publications, 1997. .
Rashbam. Commentary on the Torah. Troyes, early 12th century. In, e.g., Rashbam's Commentary on Leviticus and Numbers: An Annotated Translation. Edited and translated by Martin I. Lockshin, pages 293–98. Providence: Brown Judaic Studies, 2001. .
Numbers Rabbah 23:1–14. 12th Century. In, e.g., Midrash Rabbah: Numbers. Translated by Judah J. Slotki. London: Soncino Press, 1939. .
Abraham ibn Ezra. Commentary on the Torah. Mid-12th century. In, e.g., Ibn Ezra's Commentary on the Pentateuch: Numbers (Ba-Midbar). Translated and annotated by H. Norman Strickman and Arthur M. Silver, pages 256–67. New York: Menorah Publishing Company, 1999. .

Maimonides. The Guide for the Perplexed, part 3, chapters 40; 47; 50–51. Cairo, Egypt, 1190. In, e.g., Moses Maimonides. The Guide for the Perplexed. Translated by Michael Friedländer, pages 342–43, 369, 382, 390. New York: Dover Publications, 1956. .
Hezekiah ben Manoah. Hizkuni. France, circa 1240. In, e.g., Chizkiyahu ben Manoach. Chizkuni: Torah Commentary. Translated and annotated by Eliyahu Munk, volume 4, pages 1036–45. Jerusalem: Ktav Publishers, 2013. .

Nachmanides. Commentary on the Torah. Jerusalem, circa 1270. In, e.g., Ramban (Nachmanides): Commentary on the Torah: Numbers. Translated by Charles B. Chavel, volume 4, pages 382–404. New York: Shilo Publishing House, 1975. .
Zohar part 1, page 114a; part 2, page 207a. Spain, late 13th Century. In, e.g., The Zohar. Translated by Harry Sperling and Maurice Simon. 5 volumes. London: Soncino Press, 1934.
Jacob ben Asher (Baal Ha-Turim). Rimze Ba'al ha-Turim. Early 14th century. In, e.g., Baal Haturim Chumash: Bamidbar/Numbers. Translated by Eliyahu Touger, edited and annotated by Avie Gold, volume 4, pages 1745–75. Brooklyn: Mesorah Publications, 2003. .
Jacob ben Asher. Perush Al ha-Torah. Early 14th century. In, e.g., Yaakov ben Asher. Tur on the Torah. Translated and annotated by Eliyahu Munk, volume 3, pages 1216–24. Jerusalem: Lambda Publishers, 2005. .
Isaac ben Moses Arama. Akedat Yizhak (The Binding of Isaac). Late 15th century. In, e.g., Yitzchak Arama. Akeydat Yitzchak: Commentary of Rabbi Yitzchak Arama on the Torah. Translated and condensed by Eliyahu Munk, volume 2, pages 795–97. New York, Lambda Publishers, 2001. .

Modern
Isaac Abravanel. Commentary on the Torah. Italy, between 1492–1509. In, e.g., Abarbanel: Selected Commentaries on the Torah: Volume 4: Bamidbar/Numbers. Translated and annotated by Israel Lazar, pages 325–40. Brooklyn: CreateSpace, 2015. .
Obadiah ben Jacob Sforno. Commentary on the Torah. Venice, 1567. In, e.g., Sforno: Commentary on the Torah. Translation and explanatory notes by Raphael Pelcovitz, pages 814–25. Brooklyn: Mesorah Publications, 1997. .

Moshe Alshich. Commentary on the Torah. Safed, circa 1593. In, e.g., Moshe Alshich. Midrash of Rabbi Moshe Alshich on the Torah. Translated and annotated by Eliyahu Munk, volume 3, pages 940–43. New York, Lambda Publishers, 2000. .
Thomas Hobbes. Leviathan, Review & Conclusion. England, 1651. Reprint edited by C. B. Macpherson, page 724. Harmondsworth, England: Penguin Classics, 1982. .
Shabbethai Bass. Sifsei Chachamim. Amsterdam, 1680. In, e.g., Sefer Bamidbar: From the Five Books of the Torah: Chumash: Targum Okelos: Rashi: Sifsei Chachamim: Yalkut: Haftaros, translated by Avrohom Y. Davis, pages 590–634. Lakewood Township, New Jersey: Metsudah Publications, 2013.

Chaim ibn Attar. Ohr ha-Chaim. Venice, 1742. In Chayim ben Attar. Or Hachayim: Commentary on the Torah. Translated by Eliyahu Munk, volume 4, pages 1740–51. Brooklyn: Lambda Publishers, 1999. .
Samuel David Luzzatto (Shadal). Commentary on the Torah. Padua, 1871. In, e.g., Samuel David Luzzatto. Torah Commentary. Translated and annotated by Eliyahu Munk, volume 4, pages 1121–38. New York: Lambda Publishers, 2012. .
Yehudah Aryeh Leib Alter. Sefat Emet. Góra Kalwaria (Ger), Poland, before 1906. Excerpted in The Language of Truth: The Torah Commentary of Sefat Emet. Translated and interpreted by Arthur Green, pages 275–79. Philadelphia: Jewish Publication Society, 1998. . Reprinted 2012. .

Hermann Cohen. Religion of Reason: Out of the Sources of Judaism. Translated with an introduction by Simon Kaplan; introductory essays by Leo Strauss, page 126. New York: Ungar, 1972. Reprinted Atlanta: Scholars Press, 1995. . Originally published as Religion der Vernunft aus den Quellen des Judentums. Leipzig: Gustav Fock, 1919.
Alexander Alan Steinbach. Sabbath Queen: Fifty-four Bible Talks to the Young Based on Each Portion of the Pentateuch, pages 135–38. New York: Behrman's Jewish Book House, 1936.
Julius H. Greenstone. Numbers: With Commentary: The Holy Scriptures, pages 337–64. Philadelphia: Jewish Publication Society, 1939. Reprinted by Literary Licensing, 2011. .

Thomas Mann. Joseph and His Brothers. Translated by John E. Woods, pages 109, 111, 447. New York: Alfred A. Knopf, 2005. . Originally published as Joseph und seine Brüder. Stockholm: Bermann-Fischer Verlag, 1943.
J. Roy Porter. "The Succession of Joshua." In Proclamation and Presence: Old Testament Essays in Honour of Gwynne Henton Davies. Edited by John I. Durham and J. Roy Porter, pages 102–32. London: SCM Press, 1970. .
Jacob Neusner. "‘By the Testimony of Two Witnesses’ in the Damascus Document IX, 17–22 and in Pharisaic-Rabbinic Law." Revue De Qumrân, volume 8, number 2 (30) (1973): pages 197–217.
Bernard F. Batto. "Red Sea or Reed Sea? How the Mistake Was Made and What Yam Sûp Really Means." Biblical Archaeology Review, volume 10, number 4. (July/August 1984).
Philip J. Budd. Word Biblical Commentary: Volume 5: Numbers, pages 348–90. Waco, Texas: Word Books, 1984. .
Michael Fishbane. Biblical Interpretation in Ancient Israel, pages 98, 104–05, 148, 172, 238, 258, 308, 363, 529. Oxford: Oxford University Press, 1985. .
Pinchas H. Peli. Torah Today: A Renewed Encounter with Scripture, pages 195–98. Washington, D.C.: B'nai B'rith Books, 1987. .
Jacob Milgrom. The JPS Torah Commentary: Numbers: The Traditional Hebrew Text with the New JPS Translation, pages 277–99, 497–512. Philadelphia: Jewish Publication Society, 1990. .
Mark S. Smith. The Early History of God: Yahweh and the Other Deities in Ancient Israel, pages 3, 47. New York: HarperSanFrancisco, 1990. ..
Mary Douglas. In the Wilderness: The Doctrine of Defilement in the Book of Numbers, pages 86, 103, 108–11, 113, 117, 120, 123, 125–26, 142, 147–48, 151–52, 161, 170, 183, 186, 229, 233, 235, 236–38, 242, 244, 246. Oxford: Oxford University Press, 1993. Reprinted 2004. .

Judith S. Antonelli. "Journey to the Land." In In the Image of God: A Feminist Commentary on the Torah, pages 392–97. Northvale, New Jersey: Jason Aronson, 1995. .
W. Gunther Plaut. The Haftarah Commentary, pages 416–27. New York: UAHC Press, 1996. .*Ellen Frankel. The Five Books of Miriam: A Woman's Commentary on the Torah, pages 242–43. New York: G. P. Putnam's Sons, 1996. .
Jacob Milgrom. "Lex Talionis and the Rabbis: The Talmud reflects an uneasy rabbinic conscience toward the ancient law of talion, 'eye for eye, tooth for tooth.'" Bible Review, volume 12 (number 2) (April 1996).
Sorel Goldberg Loeb and Barbara Binder Kadden. Teaching Torah: A Treasury of Insights and Activities, pages 284–89. Denver: A.R.E. Publishing, 1997. .
Baruch A. Levine. Numbers 21–36, volume 4A, pages 509–79. New York: Anchor Bible, 2000. .
Dennis T. Olson. "Numbers." In The HarperCollins Bible Commentary. Edited by James L. Mays, pages 186–88. New York: HarperCollins Publishers, revised edition, 2000. .
Hara E. Person. "Boundaries and Limits." In The Women's Torah Commentary: New Insights from Women Rabbis on the 54 Weekly Torah Portions. Edited by Elyse Goldstein, pages 321–27. Woodstock, Vermont: Jewish Lights Publishing, 2000. .
Sarah Idit (Susan) Schneider. “The Daughters of Tzlafchad: Towards a Methodology of Attitude Around Women’s Issues.” In Torah of the Mothers: Contemporary Jewish Women Read Classical Jewish Texts. Edited by Ora Wiskind Elper and Susan Handelman, pages 155–69. New York and Jerusalem: Urim Publications, 2000. .
Israel Finkelstein and Neil Asher Silberman. The Bible Unearthed: Archaeology's New Vision of Ancient Israel and the Origin of Its Sacred Texts, pages 58–63. New York: The Free Press, 2001. .
Lainie Blum Cogan and Judy Weiss. Teaching Haftarah: Background, Insights, and Strategies, pages 374–81. Denver: A.R.E. Publishing, 2002. .
Michael Fishbane. The JPS Bible Commentary: Haftarot, pages 262–69. Philadelphia: Jewish Publication Society, 2002. .
Tikva Frymer-Kensky. "To the Barricades: Views against the Other." In Reading the Women of the Bible, pages 199–208. New York: Schocken Books, 2002. . (.).
Joseph Telushkin. The Ten Commandments of Character: Essential Advice for Living an Honorable, Ethical, Honest Life, pages 275–78. New York: Bell Tower, 2003. .
Robert Alter. The Five Books of Moses: A Translation with Commentary, pages 852–66. New York: W.W. Norton & Co., 2004. .
Nili S. Fox. "Numbers." In The Jewish Study Bible. Edited by Adele Berlin and Marc Zvi Brettler, pages 349–55. New York: Oxford University Press, 2004. .
Pamela Barmash. “Blood Feud and State Control: Differing Legal Institutions for the Remedy of Homicide During the Second and First Millennia B.C.E.” Journal of Near Eastern Studies. Volume 63 (July 2004): pages 183–99.
Jennifer Elkin Gorman. "Haftarat Ma'asei: Jeremiah 2:4–28; 3:4." In The Women's Haftarah Commentary: New Insights from Women Rabbis on the 54 Weekly Haftarah Portions, the 5 Megillot & Special Shabbatot. Edited by Elyse Goldstein, pages 206–09. Woodstock, Vermont: Jewish Lights Publishing, 2004. .
Professors on the Parashah: Studies on the Weekly Torah Reading Edited by Leib Moscovitz, pages 290–96. Jerusalem: Urim Publications, 2005. .
W. Gunther Plaut. The Torah: A Modern Commentary: Revised Edition. Revised edition edited by David E.S. Stern, pages 1117–38. New York: Union for Reform Judaism, 2006. .
Jeffrey Stackert. “Why Does Deuteronomy Legislate Cities of Refuge? Asylum in the Covenant Collection (Exodus 21:12-14) and Deuteronomy (19:1-13).” Journal of Biblical Literature. Volume 125 (number 1) (Spring, 2006): pages 23–49.
Suzanne A. Brody. "Gag Rule." In Dancing in the White Spaces: The Yearly Torah Cycle and More Poems, page 101. Shelbyville, Kentucky: Wasteland Press, 2007. .
Shai Cherry. "The Daughters of Zelophehad." In Torah Through Time: Understanding Bible Commentary, from the Rabbinic Period to Modern Times, pages 161–88. Philadelphia: The Jewish Publication Society, 2007. .

Esther Jungreis. Life Is a Test, page 224. Brooklyn: Shaar Press, 2007. .
James L. Kugel. How To Read the Bible: A Guide to Scripture, Then and Now, page 404. New York: Free Press, 2007. .
The Torah: A Women's Commentary. Edited by Tamara Cohn Eskenazi and Andrea L. Weiss, pages 1013–36. New York: URJ Press, 2008. .
R. Dennis Cole. "Numbers." In Zondervan Illustrated Bible Backgrounds Commentary. Edited by John H. Walton, volume 1, pages 395–403. Grand Rapids, Michigan: Zondervan, 2009. .
Reuven Hammer. Entering Torah: Prefaces to the Weekly Torah Portion, pages 243–47. New York: Gefen Publishing House, 2009. .
Amber Powers. "Hearing Ancient, Courageous Voices for Justice and Change: Parashat Masei (Numbers 33:1–36:13)." In Torah Queeries: Weekly Commentaries on the Hebrew Bible. Edited by Gregg Drinkwater, Joshua Lesser, and David Shneer; foreword by Judith Plaskow, pages 224–27. New York: New York University Press, 2009. .
Raymond Westbrook and Bruce Wells. "Property and Inheritance." In Everyday Law in Biblical Israel: An Introduction, pages 91–106. Louisville, Kentucky: Westminster John Knox Press, 2009. .
Jonathan P. Burnside. “Exodus and Asylum: Uncovering the Relationship between Biblical Law and Narrative.” Journal for the Study of the Old Testament, volume 34 (number 3) (March 2010): pages 243–66..
Terence E. Fretheim. "Numbers." In The New Oxford Annotated Bible: New Revised Standard Version with the Apocrypha: An Ecumenical Study Bible. Edited by Michael D. Coogan, Marc Z. Brettler, Carol A. Newsom, and Pheme Perkins, pages 239–45. New York: Oxford University Press, Revised 4th Edition 2010. .
The Commentators' Bible: Numbers: The JPS Miqra'ot Gedolot. Edited, translated, and annotated by Michael Carasik, pages 238–54. Philadelphia: Jewish Publication Society, 2011. .
Sarah Pearce. “Philo and the Temple Scroll on the Prohibition of Single Testimony.” In The Hebrew Bible in Light of the Dead Sea Scrolls, edited by Nóra Dávid, Armin Lange, Kristin De Troyer, and Shani Tzoref, pages 321–26. Göttingen: Vandenhoeck & Ruprecht, 2011.
Calum Carmichael. "Reuben's Legacy (Numbers 32–36)." In The Book of Numbers: A Critique of Genesis, pages 159–78. New Haven: Yale University Press, 2012. .

William G. Dever. The Lives of Ordinary People in Ancient Israel: When Archaeology and the Bible Intersect, page 44. Grand Rapids, Michigan: William B. Eerdmans Publishing Company, 2012. .
Shmuel Herzfeld. "Rethinking Our Justice System." In Fifty-Four Pick Up: Fifteen-Minute Inspirational Torah Lessons, pages 246–50. Jerusalem: Gefen Publishing House, 2012. .

Shlomo Riskin. Torah Lights: Bemidbar: Trials and Tribulations in Times of Transition, pages 269–302. New Milford, Connecticut: Maggid Books, 2012. .
Juliana Claassens. “‘Give us a portion among our father's brothers’: The Daughters of Zelophehad, Land, and the Quest for Human Dignity.” Journal for the Study of the Old Testament, volume 37 (number 3) (March 2013): pages 319–37.
Eve Levavi Feinstein. “Num 35:34 and Other Biblical Texts on Land Pollution.” In Sexual Pollution in the Hebrew Bible, pages 179–80. New York: Oxford University Press, 2014. .
Bill Rudolph. “Unifying Force: What Kind of Leader Do the Jewish People Really Want?” The Jerusalem Report, volume 26 (number 7) (July 27, 2015): page 47.

Jonathan Sacks. Lessons in Leadership: A Weekly Reading of the Jewish Bible, pages 233–37. New Milford, Connecticut: Maggid Books, 2015. .
Jonathan Sacks. Essays on Ethics: A Weekly Reading of the Jewish Bible, pages 269–73. New Milford, Connecticut: Maggid Books, 2016. .
Shai Held. The Heart of Torah, Volume 2: Essays on the Weekly Torah Portion: Leviticus, Numbers, and Deuteronomy, pages 185–95. Philadelphia: Jewish Publication Society, 2017. .
Steven Levy and Sarah Levy. The JPS Rashi Discussion Torah Commentary, pages 144–46. Philadelphia: Jewish Publication Society, 2017. .
Jonathan Sacks. Numbers: The Wilderness Years: Covenant & Conversation: A Weekly Reading of the Jewish Bible, pages 391–429. New Milford, Connecticut: Maggid Books, 2017. .
Pallant Ramsundar. “Biblical Mistranslations to 'Euphrates' and the Impact on the Borders of Israel.” American Journal of Biblical Theology (2019).

External links

Texts
Masoretic text and 1917 JPS translation
Hear the parashah chanted 
Hear the parashah read in Hebrew

Commentaries

Academy for Jewish Religion, New York
Aish.com 
Akhlah: The Jewish Children's Learning Network 
Aleph Beta Academy
American Jewish University — Ziegler School of Rabbinic Studies
Anshe Emes Synagogue, Los Angeles 
Ari Goldwag
Ascent of Safed
Chabad.org
eparsha.com
G-dcast 
The Israel Koschitzky Virtual Beit Midrash
Jewish Agency for Israel
Jewish Theological Seminary
Mechon Hadar
Miriam Aflalo
MyJewishLearning.com
Ohr Sameach
ON Scripture — The Torah
Orthodox Union
OzTorah, Torah from Australia
Oz Ve Shalom — Netivot Shalom
Pardes from Jerusalem
Professor James L. Kugel
Professor Michael Carasik 
Rabbi Fabian Werbin
Rabbi Jonathan Sacks
Rabbi Shlomo Riskin
Rabbi Shmuel Herzfeld
Rabbi Stan Levin 
Reconstructionist Judaism 
Sephardic Institute
Shiur.com
613.org Jewish Torah Audio
Tanach Study Center
Teach613.org, Torah Education at Cherry Hill
TheTorah.com
Torah from Dixie 
Torah.org
TorahVort.com
Union for Reform Judaism 
United Synagogue of Conservative Judaism
What's Bothering Rashi?
Yeshivat Chovevei Torah
Yeshiva University

Weekly Torah readings in Av
Weekly Torah readings in Tammuz (Hebrew month)
Weekly Torah readings from Numbers